Georges Mouly (21 February 1931 – 7 December 2019) was a French politician and professor and a member of the European Democratic and Social Rally group.

After serving as a professor, Mouly was elected as a Senator for Corrèze in 1980, 1989, and 1998. He did not stand for re-election in 2008, and retired from his political career.

Mouly was the author of several books, including Les années d'insouciance and Profession, débutant....

References

1931 births
2019 deaths
20th-century French politicians
Mayors of places in Nouvelle-Aquitaine
Radical Party (France) politicians